Herbert Alfred Stein (March 27, 1898 – October 25, 1980) was an American football player. He later made his professional debut in the National Football League in 1922 with the Buffalo All-Americans. He played for Buffalo, Toledo Maroons,  Frankford Yellow Jackets, and the Pottsville Maroons over the course of his six-year career. Herb later joined his brother, Russ as a member of the 1925 Pottsville Maroons team that won the 1925 NFL Championship, before it was stripped from the team due to a disputed rules violation.

He grew up in Warren, Ohio and attended high school at Niles McKinley High School and later The Kiski School, located in Saltsburg, Pennsylvania. After high school, Stein attended the University of Pittsburgh and served as the team's center from 1918 until 1921. He was a consensus All-American for Pitt in both his junior and senior years and served as the team captain in 1920. He was often regarded as one of the team's greatest offensive and defensive centers.  His efforts at Pitt earned him induction into the College Football Hall of Fame in 1967.

References

1898 births
1980 deaths
American football centers
American football guards
Buffalo All-Americans players
Frankford Yellow Jackets players
Pittsburgh Panthers football players
Pottsville Maroons players
Sewanee Tigers football coaches
Toledo Maroons players
All-American college football players
College Football Hall of Fame inductees
Sportspeople from Warren, Ohio
Players of American football from Ohio
Niles McKinley High School alumni